Major General Edward Bailey Ashmore,  (20 February 1872 – 5 October 1953) was a British Army officer from the 1890s to the 1920s who served in the Royal Artillery, the Royal Flying Corps and briefly in the Royal Air Force before founding and developing the organisation that would become the Royal Observer Corps.

Early career
Following graduation from Royal Military Academy, Woolwich, Ashmore was commissioned into the Royal Regiment of Artillery as a second lieutenant on 24 July 1891, and promoted to lieutenant on 24 July 1894. He was posted to 'Q' Battery Royal Horse Artillery and served during the Second Boer War in South Africa. Promoted to captain on augmentation of the regiment on 13 February 1900, he was severely wounded at Sanna's Post during the relief of Kimberley on 31 March 1900.

In 1904, Ashmore served as adjutant for the Royal Horse Artillery and attended Staff College, Camberley in January 1906. Appointed as a staff officer on the Army General Staff. He was promoted to major in April 1909 and was returned to the establishment of the Royal Artillery. He served as a General Staff Officer 3rd Grade (GSO3) on the General Staff (War Office) and later as a 2nd Grade (GSO2).

In September 1913, Ashmore was appointed Assistant Military Secretary to the Inspector-General of the Overseas Forces and General Officer Commanding-in-Chief Mediterranean Command. In January 1914, he transferred to the special reserve of the Royal Flying Corps (RFC) and trained as a pilot.

World War I
By November 1914 he was commander of 1st Wing RFC with the rank of lieutenant colonel. The following month he was appointed Officer Commanding Administration Wing RFC. Promoted to brigadier general in January 1916, he took command of the I Brigade RFC. The following April he took up command of the newly established IV Brigade. He remained attached to RFC Headquarters unit until August 1917 carrying various ranks including brevet colonel, acting major general, colonel and major general. In August 1917 Ashmore was appointed Commander of the London Air Defence Area.

When the Royal Flying Corps amalgamated with the Royal Naval Air Service to form the Royal Air Force (RAF) in April 1918, Ashmore still held the rank of major general. On 19 April 1918 he was re-graded to air vice marshal until he resigned his RAF commission on 1 December 1919.

Air defence of London

In his later military career, Ashmore was the leading figure in the air defence of the United Kingdom, founding what would eventually become the Royal Observer Corps. He was appointed to devise improved systems of detection, communication and control. A system to be called the Metropolitan Observation Service was created which covered the London area and was known as the London Air Defence Area. This was soon extended towards the coasts of Kent and Essex. The system met with some success and although it was not fully working until late summer 1918 (the last air raid took place on 19 May). The lessons learnt were to provide valuable grounding for later developments.

Interwar
On 8 December 1920, Ashmore was appointed commander of the Regular Army's 1st Air Defence Brigade in Aldershot Command. In 1922, overall responsibility for air defence was transferred from the War Office, which was responsible for the Army, to the Air Ministry. Ashmore, who had been responsible for matters during the First World War, now reported to a new Air Raid Precautions (ARP) committee set up in January 1924. On 1 March 1924 he became General Officer Commanding of the Territorial Army Air Defence Brigades and Inspector of Regular Anti-Aircraft Defences for Great Britain. Experiments were now carried out around Romney Marsh and the Weald. These were intended to optimise the arrangement of observation posts and control centres. In 1925 these experiments were extended to cover parts of Essex and Hampshire and by October a sound methodology had been worked out. On 29 October 1925 the Observer Corps came into official existence.

Within a year four Groups existed in Southeast England, covering much of Kent, Sussex, Hampshire and Essex. The plan was that the country would be covered by 18 of these groups. The involvement and cooperation of the RAF, the Army, the British police forces and the General Post Office (GPO) (then responsible for the national telephone system), was required. Ashmore was regarded as the first commander of the Observer Corps in all but name during 1925 and he is deemed to be the Corps' founder.

World War II
During World War II Ashmore raised and commanded a battalion of the Home Guard, by which time he was over 70 years of age.

Personal life

Ashmore married Betty Parsons at Holy Trinity Church, Prince Consort Road on 17 July 1919.

Notes

References
 Brig N.W. Routledge, History of the Royal Regiment of Artillery: Anti-Aircraft Artillery 1914–55, London: Royal Artillery Institution/Brassey's, 1994,

External links
Air of Authority – A History of RAF Organisation – Major-General E B Ashmore
First World War.com – Who's Who: Edward Ashmore

|-

|-

|-

1872 births
1953 deaths
People from Paddington
Graduates of the Royal Military Academy, Woolwich
Royal Artillery officers
British Home Guard officers
British Army personnel of the Second Boer War
British Army generals of World War I
Royal Flying Corps officers
Royal Air Force generals of World War I
Royal Air Force air marshals
Companions of the Order of the Bath
Companions of the Order of St Michael and St George
Members of the Royal Victorian Order
Commandeurs of the Légion d'honneur
People of the Royal Observer Corps
Graduates of the Staff College, Camberley
British Army major generals
Military personnel from London